The second season of the historical drama television series Vikings premiered on February 27, 2014 on History in Canada, and concluded on May 1, 2014, consisting of ten episodes. The series broadly follows the exploits of the legendary Viking chieftain Ragnar Lothbrok and his crew, and later those of his sons. The first season of the series begins at the start of the Viking Age, marked by the Lindisfarne raid in 793.

The second season follows Ragnar's struggles with rival Vikings and his rise from Earl to King. The Vikings raid farther into England, and for the first time are offered land for settlement.

Cast

Main
 Travis Fimmel as Earl Ragnar Lothbrok of Kattegat, who is interested in discovering the lands and customs of England
 Katheryn Winnick as Lagertha, a shield-maiden and Ragnar's first wife; after leaving Ragnar she marries Sigvard and later becomes Earl Ingstad of Hedeby.
 Clive Standen as Rollo, a warrior and Ragnar's brother.
 Jessalyn Gilsig as Siggy, Earl Haraldson's late wife, and Rollo's lover
 Gustaf Skarsgård as Floki, a gifted shipbuilder, and friend of Ragnar
 George Blagden as Athelstan, a monk from Northumbria torn between Viking and Christian beliefs, and adviser to both Earl Ragnar and King Ecbert.
 Alyssa Sutherland as Princess Aslaug, Brynhildr's daughter and Ragnar's second wife.
 Donal Logue as King Horik of Denmark, interested in joining Ragnar's raid to England
 Linus Roache as King Ecbert of Wessex, the cunning king of Wessex
 Alexander Ludwig as Bjorn Ironside, son of Ragnar and Lagertha, in love with the slave Þórunn
 Nathan O'Toole portrays a young Bjorn Ironside in "Brother's War".

Recurring
 Thorbjørn Harr as Jarl Borg of Götaland
 Jefferson Hall as Torstein, one of Ragnar's warriors
 Maude Hirst as Helga, Floki's partner
 Morgan C. Jones as The Law Giver, the lawspeaker of Kattegat
 Carrie Crowley as Elisef, wife of Erik
 John Kavanagh as The Seer, a seiðmann
 Cormac Melia as Ubbe, eldest son of Ragnar and Aslaug
 Cathal O'Hallin as Hvitserk, second son of Ragnar and Aslaug
 Edvin Endre as Erlendur, son of King Horik
 Morten Sasse Suurballe as Jarl Sigvard, Lagertha's second husband
 Moe Dunford as Prince Aethelwulf of Wessex, son of King Ecbert
 Duncan Lacroix as Ealdorman Werferth, serving King Ecbert
 Philip O'Sullivan as Bishop Edmund
 Georgia Hirst as Torvi, wife of Jarl Borg
 Richard Ashton as Thorvard, a Viking warrior loyal to King Horik
 Gaia Weiss as Þórunn (/θorunn/), a slave and love of Björn
 Steve Wall as Einar, a relative of Jarl Sigvard
 Ivan Kaye as King Aelle of Northumbria
 Sarah Greene as Princess Judith of Northumbria, daughter of King Aelle, wife to Aethelwulf
 Amy Bailey as Princess Kwenthrith of Mercia

Guests
 Tadhg Murphy as Arne, one of Ragnar's warriors
 Anna Åström as Hild, a servant in Kattegat
 Jay Duffy as Ari, King Horik's second son
 Alan Devine as Ealdorman Eadric, serving King Ecbert
 Edmund Kente as Bishop Swithern of Winchester
 Jens Christian Buskov Lund as Olrik
 Cathy White as Queen Ealhswith of Northumbria, King Aelle's wife
 Elizabeth Moynihan as Queen Gunnhild of Denmark, King Horik's wife
 Carl Shaaban as Jesus, appearing in visions

Episodes

Production

Development
An Irish-Canadian co-production presented by Metro-Goldwyn-Mayer, Vikings was developed and produced by Octagon Films and Take 5 Productions. Morgan O'Sullivan, Sheila Hockin, Sherry Marsh, Alan Gasmer, James Flynn, John Weber, and Michael Hirst are credited as executive producers. This season was produced by Steve Wakefield and Keith Thompson. Bill Goddard and Séamus McInerney are co-producers.

The production team for this season includes casting directors Frank and Nuala Moiselle, costume designer Joan Bergin, visual effects supervisors Julian Parry and Dominic Remane, stunt action designers Franklin Henson and Richard Ryan, composer Trevor Morris, production designers Tom Conroy for the first to sixth episodes, and Mark Geraghty for the seventh to tenth episodes, editors Aaron Marshall for the first, third, fifth, seventh and ninth episodes, and Don Cassidy for the second, fourth, sixth, eighth and tenth episodes, and cinematographer PJ Dillon.

Music

The musical score for the second season was composed by Trevor Morris in collaboration with Einar Selvik, Steve Tavaglione and Brian Kilgore. The opening sequence is again accompanied by the song "If I Had a Heart" by Fever Ray.

The soundtrack album was released on June 13, 2014 by Sony Classical Records.

Additional non-original music by Norwegian music group Wardruna is featured in the episodes "Eye For an Eye", "Blood Eagle", "Boneless" and "The Lord's Prayer". The featured tracks—which were not included in the soundtrack release—are "EhwaR", "Algir — Tognatale", "Dagr", "Bjarkan", "Løyndomsriss", "Heimta Thurs", "IngwaR", "Solringen", "Helvegen", "Sowelu" and "Gibu".

Reception
The second season of Vikings received positive reviews. On review aggregator website Rotten Tomatoes, the second season has a 92% approval rating with an average rating of 8.2/10 based on 13 reviews. The site's consensus reads, "Vikings makes up for its slow pace with captivating characters and visual appeal". Metacritic which uses a weighted average, assigned a score of 77 out of 100 based on 11 reviews, indicating "generally favorable reviews".

References

External links
 
 

2014 Canadian television seasons
2014 Irish television seasons